Ak bugdaý District is a district of Ahal Province in Turkmenistan. It was founded in April 1977 as Gäwers District, with its center on the urban-type settlement of Anau. Abolished in August 1988, it was restored in 1992 as part of Ahal, where it was later renamed Ak bugday ("white wheat").

Etymology

Ak bugday in Turkic languages means "white wheat". Local lore holds that white wheat was first cultivated in this area, and the capital of both this district and its province, Anau, features a museum devoted to white wheat as well as local archeology.

Industry
The Ahal State Power Station, located about 9 kilometers NE of Anau, with design capacity of 650 megawatts, was constructed to power the city of Ashgabat.  It began operating in 2010 with two gas turbines producing 254.2 MW.  Three small gas turbines were added in 2013 and two more gas turbines in 2014, bringing capacity to 648.1 MW. The additional capacity was needed in particular to power Ashgabat's Olympic Village.

References

Districts of Turkmenistan
Ahal Region